Katherine Anne Castor (born August 20, 1966) is an American politician and lawyer currently representing  in the United States House of Representatives, serving since 2007. The district, numbered as the 11th district from 2007 to 2013, is based in Tampa. A Democrat, Castor was a member of the Hillsborough County Commission.

The daughter of former Florida state senator, president of the University of South Florida, and Florida education commissioner Betty Castor, Kathy Castor was born in Miami and raised in Tampa. She graduated from Emory College and the Florida State University College of Law. After law school, Castor primarily worked in public administration law. She was first elected to the House in 2006 and has been reelected seven times.

Early life
Castor was born in Miami. Her mother, Betty Castor (née Elizabeth Bowe), is a former University of South Florida president, a former Hillsborough County commissioner, a former Florida state senator, a former Florida education commissioner, and a 2004 U.S. Senate candidate. Her father, Donald F. Castor, was a Hillsborough County judge and died in April 2013. Castor was raised in Tampa and graduated from Chamberlain High School in 1984. She holds a bachelor's degree in political science from Emory University (1988) and a J.D. from Florida State University College of Law (1991). She is a member of Delta Delta Delta sorority.

Legal career
Castor began her legal career as assistant general counsel to the Florida Department of Community Affairs. She is the former president of the Florida Association of Women Lawyers and partner in a statewide law firm. In 2005, Castor was named the Tampa Bay Business Journal's Woman of the Year in government.

Early political career
Castor served on the Hillsborough County Board of Commissioners from 2002 to 2006. Her primary focus was on health care. She worked to stop seniors and other patients in Hillsborough County's health care plan from being forced into HMOs.

U.S. House of Representatives

Elections

2006

Castor entered the race for what was then the 11th district when five-term incumbent Jim Davis chose to run for governor (he lost to Charlie Crist in November).

Castor won the September 5 Democratic primary—the real contest in what has long been the only safe Democratic district on Florida's Gulf Coast—defeating State Senator Les Miller, Al Fox, Scott Farrell, and Michael Steinberg. She received 54% of the vote, a full 20 points ahead of Miller in the five-way race.

Eddie Adams Jr., an architect and former hospital laboratory technologist, was the only Republican to file. Castor was endorsed by the pro-choice political action committee EMILY's List, the League of Conservation Voters, Oceans Champions, The Tampa Tribune, The St. Petersburg Times and The Bradenton Herald.

Castor won the November general election, 70% to 30%, becoming the first woman to represent the Tampa Bay area in Congress and only the third person to represent this Tampa-based district since its creation in 1963 (it was the 10th district from 1963 to 1967, the 6th from 1967 to 1973, the 7th from 1973 to 1993, the 11th from 1993 to 2013, and has been the 14th since 2013).

2008

Castor was reelected, 71% to 29%, in a rematch with Adams.

2010

Castor defeated Republican nominee Mike Prendergast, a career military officer who retired in 2008 as a colonel in the United States Army, with 60% of the vote to Prendergast's 40%. It was the best showing for a Republican in this district since 1994.

2012 

After the 2010 census, Florida gained two more congressional seats. As a result, Castor's district was renumbered the 14th. It was no less Democratic than its predecessor, and Castor was reelected with 70.2% of the vote over Republican E. J. Otero.

2014 

No candidates filed to oppose Castor in the 2014 election.

2016 

Prendergast considered a rematch against Castor in 2016, but instead opted to run for sheriff of Citrus County. Christine Quinn, the founder of My Family Seasonings, challenged Castor instead, running on a pro-business and anti-immigration platform. A court-ordered redistricting cut out the district's share of St. Petersburg while pushing it further into Tampa, but it was no less Democratic than its predecessor, and Castor defeated Quinn with 61.79% of the vote to Quinn's 38.21%.

Tenure

Emergency Economic Stabilization Act of 2008 (Bailout Bill)
Castor was the only Democratic member of Congress from Florida to vote against the Emergency Economic Stabilization Act of 2008, also known as the "bailout bill," saying: "After thoughtful consideration and review, I voted against President Bush's $700 billion bailout. The Bush plan does not provide sufficient help to middle-class families in the housing squeeze or taxpayer protections." Instead, she championed programs such as the Neighborhood Stabilization Program and the American Recovery and Reinvestment Act of 2009, and said it was "the lifeline that really saved the economy." In Tampa Bay, Recovery Act funds were invested in transportation, education, housing, research, law enforcement and various local infrastructure improvements. The I-4/Crosstown Connector received the largest Recovery Act investment in Tampa Bay, with $105 million to make completion of the project possible. It opened to the public in 2014.

Iraq War
Since her first congressional campaign in 2006, Castor supported withdrawal of U.S. troops from Iraq and redeployment of U.S. troops from Afghanistan. Her first committee assignment was the House Armed Services. In 2007, Castor voted to redeploy U.S. troops out of Iraq.

In June 2021 of the 117th Congress, Castor joined 267 of her colleagues in voting to repeal the Authorization for Use of Military Force (AUMF) Against Iraq Resolution of 2002. She said, "By repealing the 2002 AUMF, Congress will take a step towards reclaiming its proper constitutional authority over the use of military force. Today’s vote is a first step in ensuring that the AUMF will not be used by any president to justify new and unrelated offensive military actions. By finally repealing this two-decade old AUMF, this legislative body can once more execute its solemn constitutional responsibility, focus on supporting our service men and women and end the blank check for war."

Education
Castor has called the GI Bill for the 21st century that passed in 2008 despite strenuous opposition by President Bush "one of the most important pieces of legislation that I have cosponsored." The bill restored full, four-year college scholarships to veterans of the Iraq and Afghanistan wars from benefits at the time that were only paying about 70% of a public college education and 30% of a private college education for returning veterans. The legislation also allowed veterans to transfer those benefits to family members.

Castor was outspoken on the cuts that the 2013 Republican sequester would create for Head Start programs as well as research programs at Moffitt Cancer Care and University of South Florida. In 2014, she supported a bipartisan budget agreement that included restoring Head Start funding with an increase of $1 billion over the sequester level and $612 million over the 2013 enacted level.

Health care
Castor has been interested in health care since her first elected position on the Hillsborough County Commission, where she defended the need to fund the county's indigent health care plan. In 2008, Castor successfully championed legislation to allow low-income families with overdue medical bills to still be eligible for student loans. Castor has served on the House Energy & Commerce Committee since 111th Congress. During her membership in the Health Subcommittee, the subcommittee worked toward progressive reform for Florida families, businesses, and university medical and nursing colleges . Since the Affordable Care Act passed, Castor has worked to educate Floridians about new patient protections and rights, and about enrollment in the marketplace exchange. She was critical of Governor Rick Scott and the Republican-led Florida legislature for not accepting more than $50 billion in federal funding to expand Medicaid to provide health care access to more than one million Floridians. With the assistance of the National Association of Children's Hospitals, she and Representative Dave Reichert founded the bipartisan Children's Health Care Caucus, dedicated to improving quality of health care and health care access for children .

Comprehensive immigration reform
Castor supports comprehensive immigration reform. She applauded President Obama's 2014 announcement on immigration accountability executive action.

Climate change 
Castor chairs the House Select Committee on the Climate Crisis. As chair, she has been credited as a driving force behind the movement and helped allocate federal funding for the issue.

LGBT rights
Castor supports same-sex marriage. In 2005, she was the lone Hillsborough County commissioner to vote against a resolution to ban gay pride activities and events. In 2013, the Hillsborough County Commission unanimously reversed its position on the ban.

In 2013, Castor filed an amicus brief in support of the Supreme Court striking down Section 3 of the Defense of Marriage Act (DOMA) and applauded the Court when it did so later that year.

In both 2019 and 2021, Castor co-sponsored and voted for the Equality Act, which would amend the Civil Rights Act to "prohibit discrimination on the basis of sex, sexual orientation, gender identity, or pregnancy, childbirth, or a related medical condition of an individual, as well as because of sex-based stereotypes."

U.S.–Cuba relations
Castor supports normalizing relations between the United States and Cuba. She visited Cuba in April 2013.

Gun policy
Castor is an outspoken advocate for gun control. After the 2016 Pulse nightclub shooting, she participated in John Lewis's Congressional sit-in to demand that those on the No Fly List lose the right to purchase firearms. Castor has spoken about her perception of Florida's lacking gun legislation, saying, "My home state of Florida has some of the weakest gun laws; we lack expanded background checks that would prevent individuals on the terrorist watch list, criminals, domestic abusers and the dangerously mentally ill from purchasing guns." She supports a ban of high-capacity magazines and reinstating the Federal Assault Weapons Ban. While acknowledging that preventing those on the No-Fly List from buying guns or banning assault rifles might not have prevented the Pulse nightclub shooting, she said, "if we could stop another tragedy. . .I think it's reasonable to say, here are a couple of common sense laws we could pass to make Americans more safe."

In the wake of the Stoneman Douglas High School shooting, Castor reiterated her support for repealing the Dickey Amendment of 1996, which discourages funding to the CDC to research gun violence prevention.

Impeachment of Donald Trump
On December 18, 2019, Castor voted to impeach President Donald Trump.

Committee assignments
Committee on Energy and Commerce
 Subcommittee on Consumer Protection and Commerce
Subcommittee on Energy
 Subcommittee on Health
Select Committee on the Climate Crisis (chair)

Caucus memberships
 Special Operations Caucus (co-chair)
Academic Medicine Caucus (co-chair)
Children's Health Care Caucus (co-chair)
Air Force Caucus (co-chair)
Congressional Soccer Caucus (co-chair)

Personal life
Castor is a Presbyterian.

See also
 Women in the United States House of Representatives

References

External links

Representative Kathy Castor official U.S. House website
Kathy Castor for Congress

|-

|-

1966 births
21st-century American politicians
21st-century American women politicians
American Presbyterians
American women lawyers
American lawyers
Democratic Party members of the United States House of Representatives from Florida
Emory University alumni
Female members of the United States House of Representatives
Florida State University College of Law alumni
Living people
Presbyterians from Florida
Politicians from Tampa, Florida
Politicians from Miami
Women in Florida politics